Matthew Derbyshire Mann (July 12, 1845 – March 2, 1921) was an American gynecologist and one of the surgeons who operated on President William McKinley after he was shot on the grounds of the Pan American Exposition on September 6, 1901, in Buffalo, New York, by anarchist Leon F. Czolgosz.

Life and career 
Mann was born in Utica, New York, the son of New York State Senator Charles Addison Mann (1803–1860) and Emma Mann (1813–1887).

He graduated from Yale University in 1867, and from the Columbia University College of Physicians and Surgeons in 1871. After two years of study in Heidelberg, Paris, Vienna, and London, he practiced in New York until 1879, then in Hartford, Connecticut, until 1882, and thereafter was professor of gynecology at the University of Buffalo until 1910.

He worked as a gynecologist at the Buffalo General Hospital, and in 1894 was president of the American Gynecological Society. He edited an American System of Gynecology (two volumes, 1887–1888), and wrote Immediate Treatment of Rupture of the Perineum (1874) and Manual of Prescription Writing (1878; sixth edition, revised, 1907).

Mann died in Buffalo on March 2, 1921.

See also 
 Assassination of William McKinley

References

External links 

 
 

1845 births
1921 deaths
American gynecologists
American science writers
Assassination of William McKinley
Columbia University Vagelos College of Physicians and Surgeons alumni
People from Utica, New York
Physicians from Buffalo, New York
Writers from Buffalo, New York
Yale University alumni